Bert Mikael Brandén (born 11 December 1959 in Stockholm) is a former Swedish backstroke swimmer. Brandén participated in the 1976 Summer Olympics, where he finished 29th in 100 m backstroke and 11th in the 4×100 m medley team.

Clubs
Stockholmspolisens IF

References

1959 births
Living people
Swedish male backstroke swimmers
Swimmers at the 1976 Summer Olympics
Olympic swimmers of Sweden
Swimmers from Stockholm
20th-century Swedish people